The Zimbabwe national korfball team is managed by the Zimbabwe Korfball Federation (ZKF), representing Zimbabwe in korfball international competitions.

Tournament history

References

Korfball
National korfball teams
National team